John Hosea Kerr III (February 28, 1936 – May 24, 2015) was a  Democratic member of the North Carolina General Assembly representing constituents in Greene, Lenoir and Wayne counties.

Born in Richmond, Virginia, Kerr grew up in Warrenton, North Carolina. He received his bachelor's degree from University of North Carolina at Chapel Hill and his law degree from University of North Carolina School of Law. An attorney from Goldsboro, North Carolina, Kerr served eight terms in the state Senate. Previously, he served three terms in the state House. In 2007, Kerr announced that he would not seek re-election in 2008. He was succeeded in office by Donald G. Davis. Kerr died in 2015.

Kerr's grandfather, John H. Kerr, served in the United States House of Representatives. Kerr's father, John H. Kerr, Jr., was a state legislator and one-time Speaker of the North Carolina House of Representatives.

References

External links

|-

|-

|-

Democratic Party North Carolina state senators
Democratic Party members of the North Carolina House of Representatives
1936 births
2015 deaths
Politicians from Richmond, Virginia
People from Goldsboro, North Carolina
People from Warrenton, North Carolina
University of North Carolina at Chapel Hill alumni
University of North Carolina School of Law alumni
North Carolina lawyers
21st-century American politicians
Lawyers from Richmond, Virginia
20th-century American lawyers